Donga Dongadi is a 2004 Indian Telugu-language romantic comedy film written and directed by Subramaniam Siva, produced by NV Prasad and Sanam Naga Ashok Kumar under Sri Saideva Productions banner and starring Manoj Manchu and Sadaf while Sunil, Manikka Vinayagam, and Rajiv Kanakala play supporting roles. The film's soundtrack was composed by Dhina, and cinematography was handled by Ajay Vincent. The dialogues of the movie were written by popular writer Chintapalli Ramana. This film marks the debut of Manoj Manchu as a leading actor. The movie is the Telugu remake of 2003 Tamil movie Thiruda Thirudi starring Dhanush and Chaya Singh directed by Subramaniam Siva. Donga Dongadi was released on 6 August 2004.It was considered as a "Semi hit" by box office India

Plot
Vasu (Manoj Manchu) is a strong-willed, reckless guy. He spends most of his time hanging out with his friends. He loves his father (Manikka Vinayagam) and brother (Rajiv Kanakala) very dearly. His brother is different from him that he is responsible and studious. Vasu ignores his father's words of wisdom and is regularly chided by his father as a good-for-nothing guy. In one such incident, he loses the trust and faith of his father as he gets involved in teasing a girl called Vijji (Sadaf). That incident makes Vasu realize the importance of having a good relationship with his father, but his father asks him to prove himself as a responsible man. Vasu travels to Vizag from Tirupati in search of a job. In Vizag, he incidentally meets Vijji again. Meanwhile, another girl Pooja (Varshita) is madly in love with Vasu. With Vasu out to prove a point to his father, he finally convinces him and also wins Vijji's hand. By the end, he also realizes the importance of family values and his love for Vijji.

Cast 

 Manoj Manchu as Vasu (credited as Manoj Kumar)
 Sadha as Vijji
 Sunil as Chandragiri Chandru
 Manikka Vinayagam as Vasu's father
 Rajiv Kanakala as Vasu's brother
 Varshita as Pooja
 Vinaya Prasad
 Varsha
 Tejashree
 Telangana Shakuntala
 Dharmavarapu Subramanyam
 Kondavalasa Lakshmana Rao
 AVS
 Shiva Reddy
 Chittajalu Lakshmipati
 Gautam Raju
 Malladi Raghava
 Ananth
 Sana

Production 
The rights of Tamil movie Thiruda Thirudi (2003) were brought by Sri Saideva Productions in 2003. Subramanyam Siva, director of the original Tamil version accepted the offer to direct the Telugu version too. Manchu Manoj Kumar was cast for the role Dhanush played in the Tamil movie and Sada for the role played by Chaya Singh. Being the debut movie of Manoj who was the son of famous Telugu actor Mohan Babu, the movie gathered lot of attention and publicity during the production. Chintapalli Ramana assisted Subramanyam Siva with the script and dialogues. Shooting of the movie began in May 2003 and the movie was released in August 2004. Subramanyam Siva also choreographed for this movie. Dhina, music director of the original movie was also taken to give the soundtrack for the Telugu version.

Release and reception
The movie was released in India and Overseas on 6 August 2004. The movie was received with positive reviews and critics praising Manoj for his portrayal of the character in the movie. Jeevi of Idlebrain gave a decent 3.5 of 5 rating for the movie and commented that Manoj has lived up to the expectations and that he had shown a lot of promise. The movie fared well at the box office.

Soundtrack

Audio release of the film was held on 4 July 2004. The audio was released and distributed by Maruti Music. Similar to the remake of Tamil Film Thiruda Thirudi, the music of this movie was composed by Dhina. The audio was well received and one song from the movie Manmadha Raja was an instant chart buster. Veturi, Bhuvanachandra, Kandikonda and Kulashekar penned lyrics for the songs in the film.

References

External links 
 

2004 films
Telugu remakes of Tamil films
2000s Telugu-language films
Indian romantic comedy films
Films directed by Subramaniam Siva
2004 romantic comedy films